Footloose: Original Soundtrack of the Paramount Motion Picture is the soundtrack album to the Paramount motion picture Footloose. The original nine-track album was released in 1984 and reached number one on the US Billboard 200 chart on April 21, 1984, where it stayed until June 23, 1984.  It contained six Billboard Hot 100 Top 40 hits, three of which reached the Top 10, including two number-one hits, "Footloose" by Kenny Loggins and "Let's Hear It for the Boy" by Deniece Williams. "Almost Paradise", a duet by Ann Wilson and Mike Reno reached number seven, plus "Somebody's Eyes" by Karla Bonoff climbed to number sixteen on the Adult Contemporary chart. Many people bought the soundtrack album without even seeing the film.

When it was re-released in 1998, four bonus tracks were added to the album, all of which were used in the film as well. In 2002, Sony International released the "Australian Souvenir Edition", also titled "Australian Cast Special Edition". Two megamixes were added to the album, featuring the Australian cast of the Footloose musical.

In 2009, Doveman released a reimagining of the soundtrack album. The original soundtrack for the 2011 remake was released by Atlantic Records and Warner Music Nashville on September 27, 2011.

Track listing

 signifies a remixer

Charts

Weekly charts

Year-end charts

Certifications

References

Bibliography

 

1980s film soundtrack albums
1984 soundtrack albums
Columbia Records soundtracks
Dance-pop soundtracks
Drama film soundtracks
Musical film soundtracks
Pop rock soundtracks
Romance film soundtracks